The Dublin county hurling team represents Dublin in hurling and is governed by Dublin GAA, the county board of the Gaelic Athletic Association. The team competes in the three major annual inter-county competitions; the All-Ireland Senior Hurling Championship, the Leinster Senior Hurling Championship and the National Hurling League.

Dublin's home ground is Parnell Park, Donnycarney. The team's manager is Micheál Donoghue.

The team last won the Leinster Senior Championship in 2013, the All-Ireland Senior Championship in 1938 and the National League in 2011.

History

In the 2005 league Dublin were relegated to Division Two in the National Hurling League, while the minor side won the Leinster Championship for the first time since 1983.  In 2006 Dublin gained promotion to Division One after victory over Kerry in the Division Two final. Following some indifferent displays in the 2006 All-Ireland Senior Hurling Championship, they still managed to save their status in the top flight of hurling counties and again contested the McCarthy Cup in 2007.  In the 2007 National Hurling League, meanwhile, despite being favourites to go down in 2007, Dublin managed to avoid relegation by finishing in fourth position. In 2009, former Clare manager, Anthony Daly was appointed manager of Dublin. Under his management, Dublin contested the Leinster Final, but lost by 2 goals to Kilkenny.

Dublin won the National Hurling League in May 2011 after a 12-point win over Kilkenny, their first national title since they won the All Ireland in 1938.  The hurlers have a very fervent following who travel in significant numbers to matches in the provinces. There has been a revival in the fortunes and popularity of Dublin hurling in recent years, and Dublin underage teams have had much success.

On 7 July 2013, they won the Leinster Final against Galway on a 2–25 to 2–13 scoreline, scoring 2–21 from play. This was the first time they had won this important competition since 1961. In a nice touch, the Goalkeeper from the 1961 team, presented Dublin Captain, Johnny McCaffrey with the Bob O'Keefe trophy.

Support

Rivalries
Dublin shares rivalries with fellow provincial sides Kilkenny, Offaly and Wexford.

Current panel

Éamonn DillonINJ
INJ Player has had an injury which has affected recent involvement with the county team.
RET Player has since retired from the county team.
WD Player has since withdrawn from the county team due to a non-injury issue.

Current management team

Appointed on a three-year term in August 2022:
Manager: Micheál Donoghue
Backroom: Francis Forde, Noel Larkin, Shane O'Brien
Coach:
Selectors:

Managerial history
Jimmy Boggan 1982–1988

Lar Foley 1988–1993

Jimmy Gray 1993–1996

Michael O'Grady 1996–2000

Kevin Fennelly 2001–2002

Marty Morris 2003

Humphrey Kelleher 2003–2005

John Bailey - Mick O'Riordan - Tommy Ryan 2005 (interim)

Tommy Naughton 2005–2008

Anthony Daly 2008–2014

Ger Cunningham 2014–2017

Pat Gilroy 2017–2018

Mattie Kenny 2018–2022

Micheál Donoghue 2022–

Players

Notable players

Conal Keaney: 2001–2020

Records

Most appearances

Top scorers

All Stars
Dublin has 8 All Stars, as of 2013. 7 different players have won, as of 2013.

1971: Mick Bermingham
1990: Brian McMahon
2009: Alan McCrabbe
2011: Liam Rushe Gary Maguire
2013: Peter Kelly, Liam Rushe2nd, Danny Sutcliffe

Honours
Dublin's hurlers have failed to replicate the success of the county's football side, having won the Senior All-Ireland Hurling final on 6 occasions, most recently in 1938. In terms of All-Ireland titles, they are significantly behind hurling's big three of Kilkenny, Cork and Tipperary. Their six titles do however place them fifth in the overall winners list, jointly tied with Wexford.

Dublin have won the Leinster Championship on 24 occasions (the second highest total of any side), although they remain well behind Kilkenny, who have won the Leinster Championship 70 times.

Dublin have won the National Hurling League three times: in 1929, 1939 and 2011. This places them joint seventh (with Clare) on the overall winners list, having won 16 fewer titles than top-ranked Tipperary.

National
All-Ireland Senior Hurling Championship
 Winners (6): 1889, 1917, 1920, 1924, 1927, 1938
 Runners-up (15): 1892, 1894, 1896, 1906, 1908, 1919, 1921, 1930, 1934, 1941, 1942, 1944, 1948, 1952, 1961
National Hurling League
 Winners (3): 1928–29, 1938–39, 2011
 Runners-up (5): 1925–26, 1929–30, 1933–34, 1940–41, 1945–46

Provincial
Leinster Senior Hurling Championship
 Winners (24): 1889, 1892, 1894, 1896, 1902, 1906, 1908, 1917, 1919, 1920, 1921, 1924, 1927, 1928, 1930, 1934, 1938, 1941, 1942, 1944, 1948, 1952, 1961, 2013
 Runners-up (36): 1888, 1893, 1895, 1898, 1899, 1900, 1903, 1904, 1905, 1907, 1910, 1911, 1913, 1915, 1918, 1922, 1923, 1925, 1932, 1933, 1939, 1940, 1943, 1945, 1946, 1947, 1954, 1959, 1963, 1964, 1990, 1991, 2009, 2011, 2014, 2021

Fingal

In 2007, the GAA announced that a hurling team from Fingal (north county Dublin) would compete in parallel to the main Dublin team, to encourage hurling in an area of growing population where the game has not been strong. While players from Fingal are eligible for the main Dublin team, non-Fingal players cannot play for Fingal. The new team competed in the Nicky Rackard Cup in 2008, and the Kehoe Cup in 2009. They played in the National Hurling League up until 2016 when the Fingal Hurling project was disbanded.

References

 
County hurling teams